Peter Lorillard may refer to:

Pierre Abraham Lorillard, New York City business man, also called Peter Abraham Lorillard and Peter Lorillard
Pierre Lorillard II, New York City business man, also called Peter Lorillard